Songon is a town in southeastern Ivory Coast. It is a suburb of Abidjan and is one of four sub-prefectures of Abidjan Autonomous District. Songon is also a commune. The town is located about 20 kilometres west of Abidjan city.

Villages in the sub-prefecture include Kossihouen.

Notes

Sub-prefectures of Abidjan
Communes of Abidjan